The Azores Triple Junction (ATJ) is a geologic triple junction where the boundaries of three tectonic plates intersect: the North American Plate, the Eurasian Plate and the African Plate. This triple junction is located along the Mid-Atlantic Ridge (MAR) amidst the Azores islands, nearly due west of the Strait of Gibraltar. It is classed as an R-R-R triple junction of the T type (for its shape), as it is an intersection of the Mid-Atlantic Ridge running north–south and the Terceira Rift which runs east-southeast.

The spreading rate along the MAR does not change abruptly at the ATJ, instead decreasing from 22.9±0.1 mm/yr at 40°N to 19.8±0.2 mm/yr at 38°N. This means the ATJ is not a simple triple junction where three tectonic plates meet at a point. The transitional range of spreading rates instead indicates the presence of a microplate, commonly referred to as the Azores Microplate, although the observed behaviour can also be explained in terms of a diffuse boundary. Its northern boundary intersects the MAR between 39.4°N and 40.0°N and its southern between 38.2°N and 38.5°N. The microplate moves about 2 mm/yr east-northeast along its Nubian boundary.

References

Notes

Sources 

 
 
 Tectonics of the Azores

External links 
 Main tectonic structures that can be defined in the area of the Azores Triple Junction

Triple junctions
Mid-Atlantic Ridge